Oslo bishopric is the Church of Norway's bishopric for the municipalities of Oslo, Asker and Bærum. It is one of Norway's five traditional bishoprics and was founded around the year 1070.

History
Oslo was established as a diocese in 1068. It was originally a suffragan of the archdiocese of Hamburg-Bremen, from 1104 on of that of Lund and starting from 1152 on of Nidaros. It then covered the (modern) counties of Oslo, Akershus, Buskerud (except Hallingdal), Hedmark (except the northern part of Østerdalen), Oppland (except Valdres), Telemark, Vestfold and Østfold, and the province of Bohuslän, and the parishes of Idre and Särna.

The Diocese of Hamar was established and separated from Oslo in 1152, but it was again merged with Oslo in 1541 (together with the northern part of Østerdalen from Diocese of Nidaros). The regions of Hallingdal and Valdres were transferred from Diocese of Stavanger to Oslo in 1631. (But Oslo had to give the upper part of Telemark to Stavanger in return.) The parishes of Idre and Särna were lost to Sweden in 1644, and the province of Bohuslän was lost in 1658. Hamar (with Hedmark and Oppland) was again separated from Oslo in 1864. The rest of Telemark was transferred to Diocese of Kristiansand (see Diocese of Agder og Telemark) the same year. The Diocese of Tunsberg (with Vestfold and Buskerud) was established and separated from Oslo in 1948. The Diocese of Borg (with Akershus and Østfold) was established and separated from Oslo in 1969.

Today the Diocese of Oslo only covers the county of Oslo and the municipalities of Asker and Bærum in Akershus.

Bishops since the Reformation
1541–1545 Hans Rev
1545–1548 Anders Madssøn
1548–1580 Frants Berg
1580–1600 Jens Nilssøn
1601–1607 Anders Bendssøn Dall
1607–1617 Niels Claussøn Senning
1617–1639 Niels Simonsen Glostrup
1639–1646 Oluf Boesen
1646–1664 Henning Stockfleth
1664–1699 Hans Rosing
1699–1712 Hans Munch
1713–1730 Bartholomæus Deichman
1731–1737 Peder Hersleb
1738–1758 Niels Dorph
1758–1773 Fredrik Nannestad
1773–1804 Christian Schmidt
1805–1822 Fredrik Julius Bech
1823–1845 Christian Sørenssen
1846–1874 Jens Lauritz Arup
1875–1893 Carl Peter Parelius Essendrop
1893–1896 Fredrik Wilhelm Klumpp Bugge
1896–1912 Anton Christian Bang
1912–1922 Jens Frølich Tandberg
1922–1937 Johan Lunde
1937–1951 Eivind Josef Berggrav
1951–1968 Johannes Smemo
1968–1973 Fridtjov Søiland Birkeli
1973–1977 Kaare Støylen
1977–1998 Andreas Aarflot
1998–2005 Gunnar Stålsett
2005–2017 Ole Christian Kvarme
2017–present Kari Veiteberg

Deaneries 
 Oslo arch-deanery
 Asker deanery
 Bærum deanery
 Nordre Aker deanery
 Søndre Aker deanery
 Vestre Aker deanery
 Østre Aker deanery
 Nationwide deaneries:
The deaf chaplain deanery
The military chaplain corps

External links
Official website

Religion in Oslo
Oslo
1068 establishments in Europe
11th-century establishments in Norway
Oslo
Organisations based in Oslo